USS Prairie (AD–15) was a  built just before the start of World War II for the U.S. Navy. Her task was to service destroyers in, or near, battle areas and to keep them fit for duty. Prior to U.S. entry into World War II, Prairie cruised between Atlantic ports from Colon, C.Z. to Argentia, Newfoundland. She was docked at Argentia, tending Allied ships, on 7 December 1941 as the first direct blows of World War II struck the United States.

She was laid down 7 December 1938 by New York Shipbuilding, Camden, New Jersey; launched 9 December 1939; sponsored by Mrs. Samuel M. Robinson; and commissioned 5 August 1940.

World War II Pacific Theatre operations

A floating workshop for American and other Allied destroyers, Prairie was “mother ship” to a squadron of destroyers at Argentia, the Atlantic terminus of the transatlantic convoy route. After repairing at Boston, Prairie returned to Argentia. On 22 February 1943, U.S. Coast Guard cutter  was rammed during an engagement with a German submarine; complete overhaul was provided by Prairie, and Campbell sailed to the United States 27 May.

Departing Argentia 23 September, Prairie steamed to Boston, and on to Pearl Harbor in November, to remain until February 1944. She departed Pearl Harbor 7 February to move with advancing forces in operations against the Marshall Islands. Lying in sheltered waters, Prairie tended destroyers throughout the remainder of the war. Majuro Atoll had been secured 7 February, and Prairie arrived there the 13th, to remain at this advantageous point for mobile supply during the costly campaign for Tarawa. Departing Majuro 3 June, she steamed to Eniwetok, where she was while fighting progressed in the Marianas and Carolines. Reporting to Ulithi 8 October, Prairie was there at war's end and remained until 1 October 1945, when she steamed to Tokyo Bay. On 30 November she steamed home to San Francisco.

Korean War operations

Prairie steamed to San Diego, destroyer force headquarters, 16 February 1946 and remained there until 11 August 1947. The Korean War demanded more hurried operations from Prairie, and she sailed to provide tending services for U.N. forces from 2 February to 3 August 1951 and again from 6 April to 10 September 1952, and from late August 1953 to 11 April 1954.

Post-Korean War operations

After this period of increased activity, Prairie continued to provide repair, supply, and medical services to ships of the 7th Fleet. In 1957, the tender returned to San Diego after completing an around-the-world cruise, a rarity for a destroyer tender. In 1958, Prairie steamed to Yokohama 8 May for the ceremonies at which Yokohama and San Diego became sister cities. In October 1959, she steamed to Taiwan for the “10–10 Day” festival, a day similar to U.S. Independence Day for the Nationalist Chinese.

In Spring 1961, the tender participated in the “Pony Express” exercises held by SEATO forces. She returned to Pearl Harbor 15 July 1966 for her first visit in over 20 years; she repaired over 100 vessels there before departing the area 6 December. During a 6-month tour at Pearl Harbor beginning in July 1967, Prairie rescued survivors from the yacht Anobell in turbulent waters 600 miles off Hawaii 11 December and transported them to San Diego.

In 1968, Prairie added a People-to-People program to her schedule of duties while at Taiwan. As part of that program, her crew painted a new orphanage and provided dental care to remote areas of the island.

The Prairie was decommissioned after over 52 years of service on 26 March 1993 at Long Beach, California, and was later towed to Singapore and sold for scrap.  At the time of her decommissioning, she was the longest serving ship in the U.S. Navy other than the USS Constitution.

External Websites
Website of USS Prairie AD-15

Booklet of General Plans, 1968

References

 

 

Dixie-class destroyer tenders
World War II auxiliary ships of the United States
Korean War auxiliary ships of the United States
1939 ships
Tenders of the United States Navy
Destroyer tenders of the United States
Ships built by New York Shipbuilding Corporation